John Maurer Woodcock (March 19, 1954August 23, 1998) was an American football defensive lineman who played professionally in the National Football League (NFL).

Early years
He attended Washington High School in Fremont, California.

Career
Woodcock was a standout defensive tackle under Coach Larry Price at the University of Hawaii (1974–1975).  He was a third-round selection in the 1976 NFL Draft of the Detroit Lions and went on to play for the Lions (1976–1980) and the San Diego Chargers (1981–1982).

Death
He died from a heart attack at his home in Fremont at the age of 44. The song "In Every Age" was dedicated to his memory by sacred music composer Janèt Sullivan Whitaker.

External links
 John Woodcock statistics

References 

1954 births
1998 deaths
Sportspeople from Eureka, California
People from Fremont, California
Players of American football from California
American football defensive tackles
American football defensive ends
Hawaii Rainbow Warriors football players
Detroit Lions players
San Diego Chargers players